Who Are You People is a 2023 drama film directed by Ben Epstein and starring Ema Horvath, Devon Sawa, and Alyssa Milano.

Plot
Alex is a 16-year-old who gains more perspective on her life as she learns of the circumstances that surround her. After her parents interrupt her seducing her teacher, she seeks out her biological father Karl whom her parents had always kept secret from her. Although she believes meeting him will magically give her insight to who she is, she's only left with more questions in the end.

Cast
 Ema Horvath as Alex
 Devon Sawa as Karl
 Alyssa Milano as Judith
 Yeardley Smith as Sarah
 John Ales as Carey
 Peter Parros as Reggie
 Reid Miller as Arthur
 Siddharth Dhananjay as Roha

Reception
Alan Ng of Film Threat said the film "is one of my favorite dramas of the year. Epstein’s plot is compelling, and his character development is brilliant. But taking a step back, the film represents the lives of real people who have made massive mistakes and are trying to move on as best they can." Common Sense Media rated the film 3 out of 5 stars.

References